Poikkal Kuthirai is an 2022 Indian Tamil-language action thriller film written and directed by Santhosh P. Jayakumar. It stars Prabhu Deva in the titular role with Varalaxmi Sarathkumar, Raiza Wilson, Prakash Raj, Baby Aazhiya, and John Kokken in other roles with Shaam in a cameo appearance.
 The film has its music composed by D. Imman, while the cinematography and editing of the film is handled by Balu and Preethi Mohan respectively. The title of the film was announced on 4 August 2021.

The film was released theatrically on 5 August 2022, and opened to positive reviews from critics and audiences.

Plot

The film begins with Kathiravan stealing all his resident's water from the pipes to fill up his house with water for his daughter Magizh. He does this as Magizh wants to learn to swim, and after asking the councilor to build a swimming pool in the area, the councilor refused to build it and suggested to build one in Kathir's house. While travelling on the bus, a goon touches a little girl inappropriately; seeing this, Kathir fights the goon even though the former only has one leg. Kathir receives some compensation cash for losing his wife and leg, so he wants to spend it for Magizh's education, but Magizh argues and wants her dad to get a prosthetic leg. 

During a dance performance on stage, Magizh faints and gets admitted to the hospital. The chief doctor says that Magizh has a heart problem and an operation has to be done. The doctor says it will cost 70 lakhs for the operation, and Kathir agrees. Kathir visits his father in jail to ask to reveal where the money he stole was hidden. His father claims he has no money but offers a solution to save Magizh. He suggests to kidnap a little girl who has a weatlthy background. Kathir refuses and scolds his father. He calls up friends but no one offers to help him.

Cast
 Prabhu Deva as Kathiravan
 Shaam as Assistant commissioner of police (cameo appearance)
 Varalaxmi Sarathkumar as Rudra
 Raiza Wilson as Gouri
 Prakash Raj as Kathiravan's father
 Baby Aazhiya as Magizh, Kathiravan’s daughter
 John Kokken as Deva, Rudra’s husband
 Bharath Raj as Aravind, Rudra’s Bodyguard 
 Jagan as Madhan

Production
The film’s title was announced on 4 August 2021. The film marks Prabhu Deva’s 53rd film as an actor. His role was reported to be a one legged man avatar. For his role, the makers had used a real prosthetic leg and the actor had started practicing with one leg. On 5 August 2021, 50% of the shoot was complete. After 10 days, the makers had resumed the film’s shooting in Chennai. 

Actresses Varalaxmi Sarathkumar and Raiza Wilson were signed in to play the two female leads. Other actors like Prakash Raj and Jagan were signed on to play pivotal roles.

Music

The music of the film is composed by D. Imman, in his third collaboration with Prabhu Deva, after Pon Manickavel and My Dear Bootham. All the song lyrics are written by Madhan Karky. The entire soundtrack album was released on 3 August 2022.

Marketing 
On 13 January 2022, the makers released a special glimpse of the film. The trailer of the film was released on 22 July 2022. A press meet of the film was held on 23 July 2022.

Release

Theatrical 
Initially, the film was expected to be released in the month of December, 2021. However, it was postponed. Finally, the film was released theatrically on 5 August 2022.

Home media 
The satellite rights of the film is sold to Kalaignar TV, while the digital rights of the film is sold to Disney+ Hotstar.

Reception
The film opened to positive reviews, with critics praising Prabhu Deva's performance.

Outlook India gave the film’s rating 3 out of 5 stars and wrote "Santhosh Jayakumar's 'Poikkal Kuthirai' is a mixed bag. In other words, it is a film that works in parts." Thinkal Menon of OTT Play gave the film’s rating 3 out of 5 stars and wrote "Poikkal Kuthirai is a one-time watch thriller with some engaging sequences. The performances of a few actors and unpredictable story progression make up for the flaws." Vignesh Madhu of Cinema Express gave the film 2 out of 5 stars, stating that "There are a lot of unanswered questions, and the film definitely has the potential for a sequel/prequel. It might even be a far superior piece of work if the makers opt for better writing choices and the rough edges in the making are polished better."

References

External links
 

2020s Tamil-language films
Films scored by D. Imman
2022 films
Films shot in Chennai